The Bulun, also known as "Rassokha", is a river in Magadan Oblast, Russia. The Bulun is the longest tributary of the Korkodon, of the Kolyma basin. Its river basin is located in a discontinuous permafrost zone. 

The river flows across an uninhabited area of the Kolyma Mountains. Formerly there was a gold-mining settlement in its basin named Rassokha, but it was abandoned in the 1970s.

Course
The Bulun is a right tributary of the Korkodon. Its source is in a small lake of the western slopes of the Kongin Range. The river flows first in a northern direction, bending towards the northwest. As it leaves the mountainous area, it bends towards the southwest in a floodplain fringing the southern side of the Yukaghir Highlands. The river flows slowly in its last stretch meandering strongly and the floodplain becomes wider, with swamps and oxbow lakes. There are also numerous small thermokarst lakes. At last the Bulun joins the right bank of the Korkodon  from its mouth.

The river is frozen between early October and late May. There is a winter road running along the left bank.

See also
List of rivers of Russia

References

External links
Anadyr - Freshwater Ecoregions of the World

Rivers of Magadan Oblast